Tim Dodd (born February 27, 1985), also known as Everyday Astronaut, is an American science communicator, YouTube content creator, photographer, and musician. After becoming popular with his space-themed photo series, Dodd was hired by the website Spaceflight Now to photograph SpaceX's CRS-3 cargo mission to the International Space Station on April 18, 2014, NASA's Orion Test Flight EFT-1 on December 5, 2014, the United States Air Force's GPS 2F-9 launch, and NASA's OA-6 Mission on March 23, 2016.

Career 
Dodd worked as a motorcycle mechanic and a photographer, where his main source of income was in wedding photography. His photography schedule allowed much free time, and he began using this free time to become involved in rocket photography.

In 2013, he purchased an orange Russian high altitude survivor suit (crucial for water landings) in an online auction and later took photos of himself in the suit at a 2014 rocket launch in Cape Canaveral, Florida, as a joke; the suit was for a time a kind of trademark of his YouTube channel. In late 2016, he grew dissatisfied with photography as his main means of employment, and continued to pursue his "Everyday Astronaut" internet persona on Instagram and Twitter. In 2017, he created a YouTube channel covering spaceflight education, and that became his primary occupation.

After applying for the mission, in 2022, Dodd was selected to participate in a lunar spaceflight as part of the dearMoon project crew. The mission will happen aboard the SpaceX Starship.

References

External links 

 Tim Dodd's work website: https://everydayastronaut.com/
 Tim Dodd's Youtube channel: 

American YouTubers
American photographers
1985 births
Living people
Place of birth missing (living people)